Pearl necklace may refer to:

 A necklace made of pearls

Music
 "Pearl Necklace" (song), a song by ZZ Top
 "Pearl Necklace", a song by MorissonPoe featured on Perfect Dark Zero

Other uses
 Pearl Necklace (horse), an American Thoroughbred racehorse
 Pearl necklace (sexual act)

See also
 
 Senecio rowleyanus, a plant species known as string-of-pearls